Pimaphera is a genus of moths in the family Geometridae. The genus was erected by Samuel E. Cassino and Louis W. Swett in 1927.

Species
Pimaphera percata Cassino & Swett, 1927
Pimaphera sparsaria (Walker, 1863)

References

Boarmiini